FPJ's Ang Probinsyano ( / International title: Brothers) is a 2015 Philippine action drama television series based on the 1997 Fernando Poe, Jr. film of the same title, courtesy to FPJ Productions. It is top billed by Coco Martin, together with an ensemble cast. The series premiered on ABS-CBN's Primetime Bida evening block and worldwide via The Filipino Channel from September 28, 2015, to August 12, 2022, replacing Nathaniel. It aired until May 5, 2020, on ABS-CBN, when the network was halted due to non-renewal of its franchise. It returned on Kapamilya Channel on June 15, 2020, and simulcasts with other network platforms.

The story revolves around five story arcs.

Book 1 (Syndicate Arc) which spans the first and second seasons ran from September 28, 2015, to May 24, 2017, focusing on various crimes which may or may not be related to the main arc of the powerful and corrupt human trafficking and drug ring of the Tuazon Family.

Book 2 (Rebellion Arc), which encompasses the third and fourth seasons aired between May 24, 2017, to March 14, 2018, focuses on the life of Ricardo Dalisay as he tries to put a stop to the maligned rebel group known as the Pulang Araw and signaling the return of a new menace his new archenemy Renato "Buwitre" Hipolito, his undercover work as part of the said group and later forming his own vigilante group/armed resistance movement with both his allies from Pulang Araw and prison, Vendetta to combat and purge all corruption,terrorism,injustice,tyranny and  any other crimes.

Book 3 (Political Arc) premiered from March 15, 2018, and concluded on April 5, 2019, consists of the show's fifth and sixth seasons, which focuses on the larger political drama in the Philippines.

Book 4 (Crime & Corruption Arc), opens with the show's seventh season which premiered on April 8, 2019, sees the restoration of Oscar Hidalgo back into the presidency and the formation of a special task force consisting of the former members of Vendetta to be led by Ricardo Dalisay in order to combat crimes and corruption in the wake of Cabrera's presidency. In  eight season, they will focusing for a new threat and violence continues to take down Cardo as a "criminal" led by the corrupt and despotic First Lady Lily Ann-Cortez along with Secretary Arturo Padua, his long-time nemesis Renato Hipolito and his right-hand man Jacob Serrano as one of his greatest foes on his dangerous missions to save President Oscar Hidalgo at the palace in the Philippines.

Book 5 (International Arc), following the death of drug lord Enrique Vera at the hands of Task Force Agila, having avenged the murder of Audrey, the sister of P/Cpt. Lia Mante and daughter of Fernando Mante, in ninth season Cardo and his team eventually travel to north to find a new hiding place. And as the series embarks to a nationwide conclusion the ultimate and last war against Renato, Lily, Arturo and the rest of their homicidal followers to put an end to their reign of terror, greed, and oppression, and bring justice for all the victims of their barbarities and atrocities. It would also signal the comeback of Oscar Hidalgo as he reclaims his role as president once again to free the whole Philippine nation from the totalitarian and corrupt rule of the triumvirate Renato, Arturo, and Lily as the powers and forces of darkness and evil prepare for a last mighty yet bloody struggle to take possession of the whole country for themselves. But Cardo and his revolutionary forces of the Task Force Agila must not waste time to eradicate their seen and unforeseen foes once and for all.

Overview

Main Characters
Coco Martin portrays two roles:
     as PS/Insp. Dominador "Ador" B. de Leon: He is Cardo's identical twin brother and a police officer in the CIDG. He is raised separately from his brother by his grandmother, Lola Flora. He enters the Philippine National Police Academy (PNPA) alongside Joaquin Tuazon. While there he meets Carmen, his classmate's sister. After he graduates as the class valedictorian, he marries Carmen upon discovering her pregnancy; she gives birth to Dominador "Junior" de Leon, Jr. Ador continues to display his intelligence and skill as a policeman and is eventually promoted to Senior Inspector. He becomes a prominent and respected CIDG police official in Manila with a loving family as his support. Early in the series, Ador is betrayed and murdered by Joaquin after pursuing the latter's child-trafficking syndicate, and Cardo is called to take his place as an officer and also as a husband and father of Ador's family. Later in 2017, he was avenged by his brother by brutally stabbing Joaquin in the neck while having a bloody fight during a rain.

     as P/Maj. Ricardo "Cardo" Dalisay: He is a police officer falsely referred to as a fugitive and the leader of his team, Task Force Agila (formerly as "Vendetta") and the overall main protagonist of the series. He was separated from his identical twin brother, and grew up in the rural town of Botolan, Zambales with his best friend Glen, who secretly has a crush on him. Cardo joins the SAF as an officer. When Ador is killed in the Line of Duty, General Delfin Borja, Cardo and Ador's maternal great-uncle and the Criminal Investigation and Detection Group (CIDG)'s director, orders Cardo to assume Ador's identity and continue the mission his late brother left behind. As part of his mission, Cardo is forced to pretend to his brother's family and friends; and reunites with his grandmother, whom he resents for deserting him. Nevertheless, he promises to find the person behind his brother's death. After his cover is blown, Cardo reveals himself and reunites with his family. Cardo is reassigned to the CIDG and tackles various cases, some which ties directly to the Tuazon family's criminal acts. Towards the end of both Season 1 and Season 2, Cardo finally kills Joaquin Tuazon to avenge his twin brother's death and to rescue his new wife Alyana after she was kidnapped by him during their wedding celebration. At the start of Season 3, they had a son named Ricardo "Ricky Boy" Dalisay Jr. and Cardo decides to quit the police force and settle down with his family, but was killed in a crossfire made by the rebel group called Pulang Araw forces him to return to active duty as a PNP-SAF officer. As more of his comrades are killed by Romulo "Leon" Dumaguit, Cardo is the only survivor left as two of his comrades are captured as he poses as Fernan to join the group. After Hipolito disperses Pulang Araw, Cardo, Romulo and former inmate Ramil Taduran co-founded a vigilante-armed resistance group named Vendetta to expose Hipolito's crimes,treachery,greed and corruption to the Philippine Government and avenge the deaths of their comrades and friends. Throughout Season 4 and Season 5, they successfully rescue various innocent people who were forced to work by Hipolito including the congressman Brandon Cabrera and the Vice President Lucas Cabrera. The President of the Philippines, Oscar Hidalgo witnesses the group's rescuing efforts. They also managed to rescue both Andy and Lorenzo at Brandon's house after Brandon attempts to rape her. Cardo shoots Brandon in time when he is about to kill both Andy and Lorenzo. After their mission during the elections, the vigilante group allowed Cardo to fix his relationship with his ex-wife Alyana and successfully took her away after accepting her engagement with Marco and they live in the North to fix their relationship. After their remarriage, the couple rejoined the vigilante group to battle against Alakdan's group excluding the authorities and later against political corruption under Lucas Cabrera's administration where they were framed as criminals in the state. At season 6, Cardo finally kills Don Emilio Syquia to avenge his father's death while the Vendetta and the people of Sto. Niño saving the captives in the mining site. Also, he finally killed Homer Adlawan to avenge Olegario's son, Romulo, and Ricky Boy's death. He also killed and brought President Lucas Cabrera to justice for Makmak and Oscar's family. Soon after, Vendetta was granted a presidential pardon from their crimes by the returning President Oscar Hidalgo. He is promoted to Senior Master Sergeant and later assigned to lead Task Force Agila, a task force consisting of CIDG boys, Vendetta members, and some new faces in the PNP. Oscar and the PNP promotes him from Senior Master Sergeant to Police Lieutenant after passing the lateral exam, then to Police Captain the same rank as his twin brother, Ador; during the celebration of Flora's Garden someone threw a grenade. He finally got his revenge on Dante Madarang Alias Bungo for the homicide of his friends when he detonated the bomb and obliterated. In season 8, Cardo and Task Force Agila encounter their newest enemy organization and a paramilitary corrupt terror group called "Black Operatives" (Black Ops for short), assigned by Sec. Arturo Padua because of the "shoot to kill order" against President Hidalgo in the news. A day later, he gets shot in the middle of crossfire by Albert De Vela, their leader, then Alyana charges to save her husband, but sadly, she got fatally wounded leading to her death at the hands of Albert. Cardo was saddened after the tragic loss of his beloved wife. Later, Teddy & Virgie arrives at the hideout to find out that their daughter passed away, both became furious towards Cardo for Alyana's death. After an argument with Lito and the Arevalos, he leaves the group for his new mission to investigate the Black Ops' whereabouts. He found Lia Mante, a member of Black Ops, captured her and used her as hostage. He came back to the group. Ramil returns to the group and explains the truth about Alyana's passing. It was confirmed that Lito was the only one to blame for Alyana's death at the hands of Albert and Black Ops. Cardo vows vengeance for his wife's death to overthrow both Lito and Albert. Suddenly, another threat begins with Renato and Jacob coming to hunt down against Task Force Agila, fighting for their lives at the forest. Lia decides to join them to fight against Renato's group. But sadly, Virgie and Teddy got killed in action. All the other members of the group sustained injuries, and they all retreated and escaped. With nowhere else to go, Lia decides to help the group find a new hiding place for safety without getting detected. During the battle against Enrique Vera's group, he avenged their daughter Audrey. Fernando cuts off Enrique's right arm and Cardo finishes off Vera as they succeeded in avenging Audrey. In the aftermath, Lia and her parents left the country for safety before the terroristic Black Ops came to investigate the house and assassinate them for her defection and betrayal against her former comrades. The Task Force Agila was forced to leave as well. In season 9, after the departure of Lia Mante & her parents, Cardo and Task Force Agila found their new hiding place at the North (located in Vigan), where the people did not know about them or tried to avoid them at all costs. The group tells Cardo about their upcoming plan: to put an end of their crimes to the government officials including Lily, Arturo, and Renato, the impersonator of President Hidalgo itself, upon exposing the truth to the people. In the series finale, Cardo risked his life to save the country from Renato,Arturo,and Lily's terrorist acts, but he was saved by Oscar as the latter finishes Renato off before the reinforcements arrive after the war ended signaling the end of the reign of terror,greed,corruption,and anarchy,Thus it concluded with the triumphant defeat and death of Renato,Arturo,and Lily and the rest of their followers. At the hospital, he emotionally reunites with his family Yolly, Elmo, Wally, and the kids (Onyok, Paquito, Dang, Ligaya, and his adopted daughter Letlet) and they inform him about his grandmother Flora's passing, as he broke down in tears. He and his family mourned the deaths of Flora, Delfin, and his fallen comrades who died during the final battle against Renato. Moments later, Cardo was promoted to "Police Major" for his heroic and bravery acts given by Oscar; he then decides to go back to Botolan to stay with his family back home, that he will promise to continue his duty as a policeman and to begin his new life. Later on, he is surprised to see Oscar and Aurora's daughter Mara at the same place. Upon reuniting, the two looked at each other and smiled, hinting a start of a relationship between them.
Maja Salvador as SPO1 Glenda "Glen" F. Corpuz: She is a female police officer and Cardo's childhood best friend. She harbors a crush on Cardo. She is later paired with officer Jerome Girona. She later leaves the series when she has to return to her hometown of Botolan, Zambales to take care of her ailing mother. Her character was described as feisty and boyish.
Bela Padilla as Carmen M. Guzman: She is introduced as Ador's wife and the mother of Junior de Leon. She works as a nurse. After she realizes Cardo has switched places with Ador and that her husband is dead, she despises Cardo and struggles with forgiving him. She later marries Joaquin but does not realize Joaquin is the one who murdered her husband. When she learns of Joaquin's criminal activities she is kidnapped by Tomas; she tries to escape but is killed. It was later revealed that her character was originally intended to just be on the show for eight weeks but it was extended. She later returns in the series (in a brief appearance) in Cardo's dream, begging him to seek justice for her death, along with Ador's. This causes Cardo to re-open Carmen's case and investigate. Her death was finally avenged when Cardo killed Tomas in jail, after being framed by Joaquin.
Arjo Atayde as PC/Insp. Joaquin S. Tuazon: He lives a double life as a police officer and the son of a criminal syndicate boss and when his father was killed by Cardo he succeeded his father as the new leader of the drug and human trafficking syndicate. When Ador had started killing Diego's men, he had no choice but to kill Ador. He later proposes to Ador's widowed wife Carmen. Don Emilio's grandson, Tomas and Verna's son, and also Rachel's older brother. Between the events of Season 1 and Season 2, Joaquin became the syndicate leader after his father Tomas was killed by Cardo during his stay at the prison in Bilibid. After Cardo dismantled the syndicate, Joaquin flees after he accidentally killed his mother Verna who wanted to stop him for causing more illegal activities made by her husband. In desperation, he successfully kidnaps Alyana during Cardo's wedding celebration in the same place where he kills Ador. Both men had a brutal fight and Cardo finally kills him by stabbing him in the neck to rescue his new wife, avenging Ador.
Albert Martinez as Tomas "Papa Tom" G. Tuazon: He is the leader of the drug and human trafficking syndicate; Verna's husband and also Joaquin and Rachel's father. He was responsible for Carmen's death, upon learning that his son, Joaquin (who proposed to the latter's death, not knowing that she was later kidnapped) later imprisoned after Don Emilio tipped off Cardo during a drug transaction. As a result, for his imprisonment, Joaquin and Don Emilio framed up Cardo for illegal drug possession. In the Bilibid, Tomas lived as a king and made everyone go underneath his dictatorship. He and Cardo had several confrontations which resulted in deaths and injuries of several people. He later planned to escape from the jail, but was stopped by Cardo. Tomas and Cardo had a fight which resulted in Tomas getting pierced by a metal pipe. He dies as a result. His death causes Joaquin to become more evil and vow revenge on Cardo. 
Agot Isidro as Verna Syquia-Tuazon: She is Tomas's wife, Don Emilio's only child, and Rachel and Joaquin's mother who does not approve of her family's illegal activities and attempts to put a stop to it. She was accidentally killed by her son, Joaquin, when she tries her best to stop him to continue the family's illegal activities.
Jaime Fabregas as Police Lieutenant General Delfin "General"S. Borja: He is Flora's younger brother and Cardo and Ador's great-uncle. He was later fired by Cabrera upon charges of conniving with Cardo and Vendetta and tortured, until rescued by Vendetta, Cardo and President Hidalgo. He was then appointed as National Security Adviser. Later in Season 9, he was betrayed and brutally murdered by Armando and his men as he sacrifice his life to save Cardo before tried to run his life dearly. Cardo and his friends avenged his death by killing Armando with their cars. Jaime’s long appearance has comes to an end as one of the top actors from the longest show in the Philippines since in the first episode.
Susan Roces as Flora "Lola Kap" S. Borja-de Leon: She is Cardo and Ador's grandmother, Pablo's mother, Delfin's older sister who had a past with Emilio. She is a kind woman and is always willing to help people without asking anything for return. She always serves her community and disapproves corruption. Her, along with her family, rivalry with Konsehala Gina serve as comic relief in the series. She also owns a carinderia and wants to serve food to the community and also make a profit for her family. In the series finale, upon finishing Lily,Lucio, and Renato, Cardo broke down upon learning from his family that Flora passed away, and he and his family visits her grave and vows to honor her memory.
Eddie Garcia as Don Emilio Syquia/Señor Gustavo Torralba: He is the leader of the mafia, human and drug trafficking syndicate; Verna's father and Joaquin and Rachel's grandfather, He is the recurring antagonist from season 1 and the overall main antagonist in Seasons 2 - 6. In Season 4, Don Emilio teams up with the corrupted Senator De Silva in their illegal activities. He also succeeds in capturing Cardo in their remote island to be tortured to avenged the deaths of his family before being rescued by Romulo and the remaining rebel group Pulang Araw and Ramil and fellow inmates who escaped in jail. After they formed a vigilante group Vendetta, He and De Silva's group faces the vigilante group by either smearing Vendetta's name or outright terrorism by using a former Pulang Araw member to bomb floats on Panagbenga Festival only to be "killed" by Cardo in a gun fight before the group kills De Silva after him. But he survived the clash, but wounded and blinded by the battle. He owned the mines that Hipolito and Cabrera wanted to join business with. At the mining site, he was finally killed by Cardo by shooting down his Airbus H125 helicopter, avenging Cardo's birth father Pablo de Leon.
John Prats as PC/MSgt. Jerome Girona, Jr.: Cardo's friend who had a secret crush on Glen. He later joined Vendetta alongside Soriano after they got wounded during their raid on Sampaloc. He got a crush on Bubbles after Homer rapes her and had a pregnancy with her baby. The two remained in a relationship until her departure after Alyana's death. In the series finale, he is accidentally killed by Ramil after Renato, Lucio, and their men tortured and disguised him as their own. He and Task Force Agila are avenged by Oscar when he saves Cardo and finishes Renato.
Yassi Pressman as Alyana R. Arevalo-Dalisay: a former news reporter and Cardo's first wife who harbors resentment over him choosing his missions over her. She had a new relationship with Marco her new boss who is later revealed as the younger son of both Lucas and Catherine. But it did not last long when Marco shows his violent behavior to her when he angrily throws a fit due to his jealously thinking she still loves Cardo. She stayed at her parents as her father Teddy protects her from Marco and his violent behavior. Later, she reluctantly accepts Marco's engagement after he gave her the annulment papers but was taken away by Cardo to live with him in the provincial town to fix their relationship. She was initially angered at Cardo for being in the vigilante group until he reveals that his group are killing people who were involved in corruption and not to kill the innocent civilians. As soon as she stays with Cardo, she feels guilty for her actions knowing that she still loves him. While in hiding with Cardo, she reconciles with him and rekindle their former love. They latter remarry each other. Alyana later joins Vendetta to assist her husband Cardo and his group. After given pardon, she decided to run for Barangay Captain of Bagong Pag-Asa and won by a landslide victory. In Season 8, Alyana's life sadly comes to an end when she was fatally shot several times along with Cardo, who is wounded between the crossfire of Task Force Agila and Black Ops Unit. Her death was avenged when Cardo finished off Lito, and later with Task Force Agila by taking down Albert's helicopter.
Michael de Mesa as Pat. Ramil "Manager" D. Taduran: Cardo's long-time companion and a survivor of the prison against the Tuazon family. As well as one of co-founders of the vigilante group, Vendetta. In season 7, After being pardoned by President Oscar Hidalgo, he assigns him to become a member of PNP of an anti-terrorist group, Task Force Agila. In season 8, he was manipulated by Lito becoming his minion, but he reveals the truth about Lito's betrayal for assaulting Alyana leading for her death at the crossfire by Albert and the Black Ops. He returns to their group to apologize for betraying his own comrades, as soon he finds out the truth about Renato and Jacob coming to take down the Task Force Agila, leading in the deadly forest battlefield. Soon Alyana's parents had killed in action, unable to risk themselves into safety. In the aftermath, the group had collapsed their injuries, and able to retreat from Renato's men. In the series finale, Ramil and Task Force Agila sacrificed their lives for Cardo and Oscar. Oscar would later avenge their deaths by killing Renato.
Angel Aquino as Brig. Gen, Diana T. Olegario: The head of the National Military Intelligence Group (NMIG) who thoroughly investigates the supposed terrorist attacks conducted by Pulang Araw and who later becomes one of the leaders of Vendetta after Maj. Catindig made an attempt to assassinate her. She later became the wife of Romulo Dumaguit during their stay at Sto. Niño until she becomes widowed when Romulo sacrifices himself to save her from Alakdan's multiple gunshots to his death. Soon after Vendetta was pardoned from their crimes, she was reassigned by President Oscar Hidalgo to the National Security Council. In the series finale, she, along with the other members of Task Force Agila, sacrificed her life for Cardo and Oscar while holding off Renato. She and Task Force Agila are avenged when Oscar killed Renato, bringing an end to his crimes.
John Arcilla as Renato "Buwitre" Hipolito: Cardo,Romulo & Oscar's main arch-nemesis and final antagonist of the series a power-hungry and tyrannical warlord. He was Romulo Dumaguit's former best friend and a Pulang Araw sleeper-agent who rose to the rank of Secretary of National Defense. In his term as the Secretary, he orchestrated acts of terrorism through Maj. Catindig and Alakdan in order to boost his popularity and transition to a seat in the Senate in which he hopes would catapult him to the Presidency. It is revealed later on in the series finale, that his partner and former nemesis Lucio was the one who created the bombs for Homer to use on the people, as means to stoke fear and to boost Renato, and in the process killed Cardo's son. As Pulang Araw learned of his treachery, Romulo tried to kill him, but Cardo prevented him from doing so. In the senatorial elections, his arch-nemesis was incumbent Senator Mateo De Silva. He lost the election but was appointed Secretary during Cabrera's presidency, which he was involved in talks with illegal miners and loggers. On the shootout between him and Cabrera's group and Vendetta, wherein Cabrera died, he is shot by Diana but later recovers with the help of Lily. He became widely regarded as the most wanted criminal in the Philippines. Later, he joined forces Jacob Serrano to further boost their business and take down their enemies. During the second half of Season 8, Renato becomes a free man and runs for the presidency against Lily. In the series finale, he is successfully eliminated by Oscar after attempting to kill Cardo, avenging the deaths of Task Force Agila and bringing back the peace and justice the country was longing for.
Jhong Hilario as Homer "Alakdan" Adlawan: A corrupt member of Pulang Araw who does the bidding of Renato Hipolito by performing acts of terrorism with his splinter group, Kamandag. Their group was used by Hipolito to successfully frame Vendetta to make the president believe they were behind the attacks as they were the ones who did it. During the infiltration of the Vendetta hideout as most of his men were killed by Romulo. Homer and his men pursue Cardo after he had shot Happy until Cardo ambushes him. Both fought into a dangerous brawl and Homer overpowers Cardo who was knocked on the ground. He attempted to kill Cardo by stabbing with a knife but was blocked and was soon defeated by him by stabbing him with a broken beer bottle. Alakdan later awakens after all of his men were killed by Romulo's group and the authorities and being defeated by Cardo in a brawl, he was calling for help due to his stab wound. After surviving from his wounds, Alakdan and his group continued to watch the turn of the events where Lucas is now the President of the Philippines and frequently berates Hipolito for his unsuccessful plans. Meanwhile, his group were sent in Sto. Niño in Gustavo's mining. But during the battle and the fall of both Baldo and Tanggol, they successfully captured both Olegario and Bubbles. He is also responsible for killing Romulo when he shields his wife from getting shot multiple times before he allows his men to recapture her. He later rapes Bubbles during her and Olegario's captivity on their hideout. Meanwhile, Cardo & the Vendetta successfully saves Olegario & Bubbles at Hipolito's hideout, he & Cardo were about to brawl one last time. Later, he was killed by Cardo by shooting him on his knees and head, avenging Diana's only son, SP02 Bernardo Quinto, Jimboy, Happy, Romulo and Ricky Boy. In the series finale, it is revealed that Renato's partner Lucio was the one who created the bombs that Homer used which killed Cardo's son, and Cardo would finish him off to avenge his friends in Task Force Agila and for his son.
Mitch Valdes as Konsehala Gina Magtanggol: The kapitana of the town Lola Flora and her family lives in. Like the other villains in the series, Gina is also corruptive. To gain popularity towards most people in the barangay, Gina makes a ruse by pretending herself to be kidnapped by her captors (revealed as her barangay tanods) and was injured as Wally warns Lola Flora and the others that Gina was pretentious and corruptive. She also serves as the comic relief in the series together with her sidekicks Nick and Gido. She later became the councilor of the town after she won the elections by cheating. She was also responsible for evicting Lola Flora and the others because of their alignment in the vigilante group in Vendetta. In Season 7, she still continues to meddle with Cardo's family despite the fact that Vendetta has been pardoned from their crimes and was commended for saving President Oscar Hidalgo. She later leaves the series to be imprisoned along with her group for the assassination attempt of Alyana and Bubbles.
Sid Lucero as Major Manolo "Nolo" Cantindig: Director Hipolito's ambitious right-hand man who plots to take over the leadership of the National Military Intelligence Group (NMIG), and later developing a fierce rivalry with Alakdan over Hipolito's trust. He and his group makes a total wipe out inside the hospital causing more casualties in order to kill Romulo. He was smashed by Cardo from a motorcycle to rescue Romulo. As a last resort, he took Andy as a hostage and was soon killed by Cardo by shooting him.
Pokwang as Amor Nieves: Wally's older sister and Cardo and his family's landlady and friend. She later leaves the series and her salon when she becomes engaged to her boyfriend. Her nail salon is currently under the management of Lola Flora and Marikit. Her brother, Wally, remains friends with Cardo's family through the series finale.
Lito Lapid as Romulo "Leon" Dumaguit: The leader of the rebel group Pulang Araw and later on became Cardo's second mentor who later co-founds the vigilante and revolutionary armed group Vendetta with Cardo and Ramil Taduran. In Season 6, he marries Diana Olegario and together with Vendetta to rescue the people of Sto. Niño from both Tanggol and Baldo's bandits. He also manages to kill Baldo to avenge Aubrey's death until he briefly rescues his wife from Alakdan's group and sacrifices himself to save his wife from Alakdan's multiple gunshots to his death before he let his men recapture Olegario. He was given a burial along with Aubrey's grave by Vendetta and all people from Sto. Niño as Cardo vows to avenge Romulo's death. His death was avenged by Cardo using his revenge on Homer.
J. C. Santos as Marco Cabrera: Catherine and Lucas's son who is deeply in love with Alyana and is madly determined to win her heart. According to his mother Catherine, Marco has a tendency to commit suicide when he shows his violent streak which turned out to be his mental personality. Like his half-brother Brandon, he was very obsessive and violent if anyone or Alyana dislikes his interests especially his violent behavior which his aunt Menchu was doing her best to calm him down. He was also unaware of both his father and half-brother were involved in their illegal actions within the Philippine Government. After Alyana was taken away by Cardo during his engagement, Marco was searching for her whereabouts, thinking that she was hiding with Lola Flora or her parents. He later continues his search for Alyana's whereabouts until they return to Manila after she and Cardo are remarried. He dangerously shows his murderous instincts within his yandere persona, wanting to kill them both. Failing to kill both Cardo and Alyana, Marco creates his own group to disperse Vendetta who were now escaping from their hideout by the authorities. However, after the car chase, he was soon killed along with his group by Cardo and his group in a rain of bullets before Anton shoots both cars in explosion from his grenade launcher.
Edu Manzano as Vice President Lucas Cabrera: A corrupt Vice President, Catherine's husband, and Marco and Brandon's father. He is secretly the owner who sells smuggled firearms to Alakadan and his group. He and Brandon are opposed on Marco's relationship with Alyana due to her being Cardo's soon to be ex-wife. He and Brandon supports Hipolito for his ambitions to run for Senator and they begin their reign of ascension by doing illegal activities during the political campaign. He currently became the President after his successful ambush plot towards Oscar including his family which leaves Oscar and Aubrey survived the ambush and begins his reign of corruption by manipulating everyone that Vendetta is the criminals in the state as well as to kill people who were up against him. Marco and Brandon's deaths causing Lucas is more evil and vowing revenge on Cardo, Vendetta and his whole family. He is killed by Cardo, finally ending his evil regime and avenging Makmak and Oscar's First Family. 
Rowell Santiago President Oscar Hidalgo and Mariano Patag: The President of the Philippines, Marissa's husband, and Aubrey, Mary Grace and Yohan's father. He is also the former best friend of Lucas Cabrera. As President, Oscar witnesses all of the rescuing efforts of the vigilante group Vendetta and has an intense confrontation with Lucas who is doing all illegal actions along with Brandon and Hipolito. He was soon rescued by Cardo in his wounded state following the ambush made by Lucas and was recuperating at Wangbu's house to recover from his injuries. After learning that it was Lucas who killed his family in the ambush and took over as the President of the Philippines, Oscar joined Cardo and his vigilante group to stop Lucas and his administration. He continues to fight with the group after Cardo rescues his daughter Aubrey from getting ambushed which it was plotted by Lucas. He later helped Cardo rescue Borja and later the people in Sto. Niño after they were being held captive by both Baldo and Tanggol's bandits after Baldo killed his daughter Aubrey during their escape. After Romulo's death at the hands of Alakdan, he was the only one to inform Cardo to continue fighting for the sake of their country. After Lucas' death and the downfall of his allies, he finally returns as the President and pardons Cardo and his allies. Later in the seventh season,  he fell in love and married Lily Ann Cortez. He was then manipulated by the First Lady by giving him drugs disguised as medicine to heal his headache, causing him to act violently and being angry to his subordinates, especially to Delfin and Diana, thinking that they betrayed him. These factors turned him into a short-lived antagonist during the second half of the seventh season. Later he fell into a coma and in the 8th Season while he was in a coma, he discovers his wife's illegal activities to establish a drug laboratory and that his wife hired Mariano, who looks exactly like him. He soon woke up after his coma and was told by his guard Ambo that his wife was using him for illegal activities and he, Ambo, and housemaid Elizabeth flee the place to meet with Cardo in Vigan. Later, he is reunited with Aurora, his long lost love and learned that his daughter with her is alive. Upon reuniting with Task Force Agila, he and Aurora learned that Mara is presumably killed. Oscar and Task Force Agila later confronted Armando and soon was forced to fight Armando and his men, as General Borja reveals their betrayal and sacrifices his life. After he and Task Force Agila honored and said farewell to General Borja, he and Task Force Agila worked with Senate President Camilo Edades to expose Lily and Renato's hellish devices, which were successful. Before returning to the palace, he and Aurora declare their love and Oscar promises to make Aurora her First Lady. Soon, the final missions began, and Oscar and Task Force Agila succeeded in finishing and wiping out Albert, Armando, Lily,Lolita and the rest of their supporters. In the series finale, he avenged the deaths of Task Force Agila by eliminating Renato and saving Cardo's life. After holding the funerals of Cardo's friends, he informed him of the sacrifices of Task Force Agila and is soon joined by Cardo's family, who delivered the news of Lola Flora's death. He then would promote Cardo to Police Major, but Cardo informs him of his plans to continue his duties on his hometown in Botolan, which Oscar accepted. Oscar and Aurora later married (effectively making Aurora First Lady), but unbeknownst to them, Cardo would reunite with their daughter Mara.
On the other hand, Mariano Patag was Oscar's impostor. He was hired by Lily to pretend to be the President while Oscar was still in coma, and so that Lily can take over the country through Mariano. Mariano is a perverted guy, as he got Art's wife Ellen and Lily's niece Cassandra pregnant and was once the subject of scandal when Art and Renato hired someone to seduce him and record their footage. Unaware that the president is fake, Cardo shot him in Vigan and abducted him along with Ellen. Task Force Agila and Armando beat him up until he revealed he was not Oscar. He was later killed when Lily detonated the bomb vest Cardo set up on him.
Jolo Revilla as PSG Commander Harold Casilag: The president's main security officer. He and Aubrey have a secret love interest for each other. He devotes his whole life in protecting the president and his family. During an ambush made by Vice President Lucas Cabrera, Harold was killed after protecting the president from a gunshot wound. Prior to the ambush, Harold was the only one who witnessed Romulo killed William Celerio when he is about to shoot General Olegario to think they were enemies.
Mark Anthony Fernandez as Brandon Cabrera: Lucas's son and Catherine's stepson. Like his father, he was opposed to Marco's relationship with Alyana and also works with his father to sell smuggled weapons and like his step-brother Marco, Brandon angrily throws a fit if others rejected his interest when he was attempting to rape Andy which prompted Vendetta to infiltrate his territory, he was soon shot by Cardo when he is about to kill both Andy and Lorenzo and was hospitalized after calling his father Lucas due to his gunshot wounds. He was currently incarcerated in the PNP Headquarters until Lucas pardons him when he became the President of the Philippines. Brandon also had an intense confrontation with Hipolito when it comes to illegal business. He became SAP to Cabrera and to continue the business operations. He was later responsible for killing Mayor Adonis Dimaguiba in cold blood and was witnessed by Margie who finally exposed him in the media as the perpetrator for killing him. He is later killed by Cardo, Alyana and the rest of the Vendetta, causing his father Lucas to kill his family that leads to the death of Makmak.
Bobby Andrews as Special Assistant to the President William Celerio. Oscar is unaware that William is secretly working with Lucas as he does this to cover up their corruptive actions. However, he later became a scapegoat to both Lucas and Hipolito who were planning to kill him with the group Kamandag. When Vendetta tried to rescued him from Kamandag, he attempted to shoot Olegario, thinking he would be attacked by the vigilante group, but was shot and killed by Romulo to rescue Olegario and was witnessed by Harold Casilag.
Ryza Cenon as Aubrey Hidalgo: She is Marissa and Oscar's daughter, the half-sister of Mara, and Yohan and Grace's older sister. Aubrey seems to be cheerful but it is unclear if she will be an enemy or a rival. She was currently in a comatose state after the ambush made by Vice President Cabrera until she moved her right hand indicating her survival from the ambush. She was soon rescued by Cardo from drowning after they successfully foiled Lucas' ambush plot and reunites with her father Oscar. She later takes care towards Rosa's children after Marie secretly hides them to their home due to Rosa's maltreatment and abuse. During the gunfight between Vendetta and both Tanggol and Baldo's group, she was killed from getting shot into her head much to Oscar's horrible shock and grief and mourns over the loss of his daughter. Her death was avenged after Romulo fought and killed Baldo by throwing a bamboo stick towards his chest in the battle of Sto. Niño.
Francis Magundayao as Yohan Hidalgo: Oscar and Marissa's eldest child, the half-brother of Mara, brother to Aubrey as well as Mary Grace's older brother. He was later killed in an ambush ordered by Vice President Cabrera. His death finally avenged when Cardo kills Lucas.
Dawn Zulueta as First Lady Marissa Hidalgo: Oscar's wife, and Mary Grace and Yohan's mother. She was the last person to be shot by Terante's men during the third phase of the ambush made by Vice President Cabrera and succumbs to her wounds after being treated inside the hospital. Her gunshot wounds on her lower back were later proven fatal and dies just a few moments after her two other children, Yohan and Mary Grace. Her death finally avenged when Cardo kills Lucas.
Alice Dixson as Second Lady Catherine Cabrera: Marco's mother, Lucas's wife, and Brandon's stepmother. She was the only person who could calm her son Marco whenever he angrily throws a fit and contemplates suicide. Catherine soon arrives in the Philippines after attending a convention prepared by her husband Lucas as various media reporters are asking her about both Lucas and Brandon are involved in Lorenzo Alano's kidnapping. Like her son Marco, Catherine is also unaware of both her husband and her step-son are doing illegal actions in the Philippine Government which is why she angrily confronts her husband Lucas due to their involvement. However, after realizing that Marco was getting out of control because of his murderous personality, Catherine's only fear is when Marco will be killed in a crossfire (which eventually happened). She also discovers her husband Lucas was talking with Hipolito and sided with him the whole time knowing that he was tainting her family for their involvement to stop Vendetta. She later becomes vengeful and full of hate after Marco is killed. She later leaves the series to go to America to help subside her hurt feelings. Her fate after her husband and stepson's deaths is unknown.
Lorna Tolentino as First Lady Lily Ann Cortez: also known as The Red Dragon Queen,an enigmatic bureaucrat she was a mysterious mastermind woman who was President Cabrera's former bag lady; she collects the protection money from the syndicates that are protected by Cabrera's administration. She was later married to Oscar Hidalgo and became the First Lady in the Philippines until she betrays him by manipulation for using illegal drug that makes him very unconscious. She is one of the main antagonists in second half of Seasons 7, 8, and 9. In Season 9, Lily announced her candidacy for President of the Philippines after her husband's presidency term has ended. However, her downfall came when Oscar and Senate President Camilo exposed her and her diabolical actions.Now the First Lady herself turns into a bloodthirsty warlord and ready to wage a cruel and violent war and launch a counterrevolution against  Task Force Agila,President Hidalgo,and Cardo Dalisay.She is later killed by Cardo and Task Force Agila after holding Oscar hostage in a final standoff outside the manor, avenging the death of Clarisse Padua and thus putting an end to her reign of terror.
Tirso Cruz III as Sec. Arturo "Art" M. Padua: He is the recurring antagonist in Season 7-8 of the series. He was a former judge who convicted Tomas Tuazon for his crimes. He becomes one of Cardo's main adversaries in the ninth season. He takes over role of Renato as the main antagonists in the first half of Season 9. He is later betrayed and killed by Renato and Lucio, while fleeing from the law.
Julia Montes as Maria Isabel Guillermo Hidalgo/Mara Silang: an assassin and a protagonist in Season 9. She is the long-lost daughter of President Oscar Hidalgo and Aurora Guillermo and adopted daughter of Armando and Lolita Silang and a childhood friend of Lucas Catapang. She was raised by her adoptive parents to despise and was trained to kill her biological grandfather, Don Ignacio Guillermo, who was the reason Armando and Lolita's biological daughter died. She was presumably killed and thrown to the sea. However, in the series finale, unknown to Oscar and Aurora, their daughter survived and is reunited with Cardo, where they both looked at one another and smiled, hinting the start of a relationship between the two.
Richard Gutierrez as Angelito "Lito" Valmoria: He is the one of the main antagonist in Season 8-9 of the series. He is one of Cardo’s strongest rivals from Alyana'ѕ heart, who was his childhood sweetheart. Lito is cunning, real traitor and powerfully rich. However, things bent on their ledges when an opportunity arises for Alyana's father to work at Manila as a reporter. Alyana joins her family, consequently leaving Lito behind, but not before making a vow to return to him once she accomplishes her goals. Lito was reluctant but eventually agreed, holding on to her promise. He tries his best to capture and win Alyana's heart from forgetting their promise when they were young but failed when Alyana chose her husband, Cardo instead. Lito was also responsible for conspiring with the Black Ops that resulted Alyana'ѕ ultimate passing. After the bloody showdown, he was stabbed and killed by Cardo for avenging his wife, Alyana.
Sharon Cuneta as First Lady Aurora Guillermo―Hidalgo: Don Ignacio's daughter and Oscar's first love interest. She elopes with Oscar to San Andres to start a life there, eventually giving birth to her and Oscar's child. Eventually, Don Ignacio finds her whereabouts and massacres the town, killing a majority of the residents. To keep her from Oscar, Ignacio sends her to live in the US. She only comes back to the Philippines after Ignacio gets severely wounded by Mara. In the series finale, she becomes First Lady and marries Oscar. Unknown to her and Oscar, their daughter survived and is with Cardo.
Charo Santos-Concio as Ramona: A leader of another rebel group and Cardo's ancient and first mentor. She finds Cardo when he fights some goons to avenge his parents. She then teaches him to fight for human rights,social justice,and total peace and liberation of the country also to fight against injustices,crimes,corruptions,and most of all despotism and tyranny and against the oppressive and exploiting ruling dominant classes. She saves Cardo again after he kills Lito, avenging Alyana. When the Black Ops attacks the base, Cardo helps her and her group to fight back. After the fight, she urges Cardo to go and find Oscar. Thanks to Ramona's actions, he and Oscar would go on with Task Force Agila to eliminate Albert, Armando, Lily,Lolita,Lucio and Renato and the rest of the hordes of their minions to emancipate the Philippines from their totalitarian rule.

Supporting Characters 
Joey Marquez as Nanding Corpuz: Glen and Brenda's father, Lolit's husband. He is a funny person, jolly, and always tries to lighten up the mood when all else are serious. He, along with his family, leave Manila to return to his hometown of Botolan, Zambales to take care of his ailing wife. 
Malou de Guzman as Lolit Fajardo-Corpuz: Nanding's wife; Glen and Brenda's mother. She doesn't approve of Glen's work as a cop. She always gets stressed every time Glen goes on a mission which sometimes results in her blood pressure to increase. She and her family later leave the series to return to their hometown to help her recover from her illness. 
Malou Crisologo as Yolanda "Yolly" Capuyao-Santos: Elmo's wife and Makmak's adoptive mother who treats Lola Flora like her own mother. She helped her during this time. She is also close with her grandson Cardo. In the series finale, she and her husband, along with Onyok and the kids emotionally reunited with Cardo after he and Oscar finished off Lucio and Renato. They revealed to him that Lola Flora passed away, in which Cardo broke down. After visiting Lola Flora's grave, Yolly, Elmo, and the kids with Onyok moved to Botolan to be close with Cardo and to take care of him.
Beverly Salviejo as Cita "Yaya Cita" Roque: The maid of the Tuazon Family who is Verna's confidant. She later got killed by Tomas after attempting to reveal to Verna about Rachel's demise. 
Pepe Herrera as Benjamin "Benny" Dimaapi: Cardo's sidekick (formerly twin brother Ador's) and loyal best friend. He was later kidnapped by Joaquin's men and was tortured, forcing him to lure Cardo to Joaquin so that he would be killed. When he saw Joaquin's men, Benny later back out and shielded Cardo from getting shot. As a result, he was shot, which caused his death. His death was one of the main reasons why Cardo wanted to find Joaquin. His death was then avenged once Joaquin was killed by Cardo. 
Marvin Yap as Elmo Santos: Yolly's husband and Makmak's adoptive father. Like his wife, he is supportive and helpful to Lola Flora. He also has a close relationship with Cardo. In the series finale, he and his wife with the kids and Onyok reunited with Cardo  after he and Oscar finished off Renato and Lucio. They revealed to him that Lola Flora passed away, in which Cardo broke down. After visiting Lola Flora's grave, he and his wife with Onyok and the kids moved to Botolan to be close and to take care of Cardo.
Eda Nolan as Brenda F. Corpuz: Glen's older sister, Nanding and Lolit's daughter. She is the polar opposite of Glen; girly, feminine, and a softy. She and her parents always tease Glen about her crush on Cardo. Brenda later leaves the series to return to Botolan to help aid Lolit, her ailing mother. 
Belle Mariano as Rachel S. Tuazon: Joaquin's late sister, Verna and Tomas's daughter, and Don Emilio's granddaughter. She is totally unaware of her family's criminal activities. Verna later reveals to her about Joaquin, Tomas, and Don Emilio's activities. She was later killed in ambush which Apollo planned to get revenge on Don Emilio. 
Art Acuña as Police S/Supt. (Colonel) Roy Carreon: Ador's former commandant in the PNPA and later one of his and Cardo's commanding officers in CIDG. He is Gen. Borja's trusted aide-de-camp who later becomes a reluctant protector of the Tuazon family's drug empire in order to finance the treatment of his daughter, Rona. He becomes instrumental in the reversal of Cardo's conviction by revealing the dealings of Joaquin Tuazon. He later was imprisoned as a result. Roy was later stabbed to death by Don Emilio. His death was avenged when Cardo killed Don Emilio in their final encounter.
John Medina as P/Cpt. Avel "Billy" M. Guzman: Ador's brother-in-law, Carmen and Ryan's older brother and one of Cardo's allies in CIDG. He would later become both part of Vendetta and Task Force Agila with Cardo and their friends, during their fights against their enemies and Renato. In the series finale, he sacrificed his life with Task Force Agila while being outnumbered by Renato and his forces. He and Task Force Agila are avenged by Oscar upon defeating Renato and saving Cardo.
Lester Llansang as P/Cpt. Mark Vargas: A friend of Cardo in the police force.
Michael Roy Jornales as P/Cpt. Francisco "Chikoy" Rivera: Another friend of Cardo in the police force. In Season 7, he was later killed by Dante tries to manage to stand his ground after the funeral and Cardo and Task Force Agila vows to avenge his death. His death was indirectly avenged by Cardo by shooting Dante before he exploded.
Marc Acueza as PS/Insp. Bernardino "Dino" Robles: Joaquin's friend and accomplice who helps protects Joaquin's family's illegal business. He was later killed by Joaquin after his conscience started to bother him and almost ratted the operations of the Tuazon crime family to CIDG. 
Rino Marco as PS/Insp. Gregorio "Greg" Sebastian: Joaquin's friend and accomplice who is one of the protectors of Joaquin's family's businesses in the police force. He was later killed by Cardo to avenge Benny's death. 
Marc Solis as P/MSgt. Rigor Soriano: Cardo, Jerome, and Glen's friend in the police force. He became a part of Vendetta and Task Force Agila with Cardo and their friends, in order to stop the crimes of many enemies including Renato and Lily. In the series finale, he is accidentally killed by Patrick after being tortured by Renato, Lucio, and their men by disguising him as their own. He and Task Force Agila are avenged by Cardo and Oscar, as the two finished Lucio and Renato.
Ping Medina as Diego Sahagun: A member of Tomas's drug and human trafficking businesses who attempts to expose their illegal businesses. He was later killed by Joaquin after attempting to tell Cardo that he was the one who murdered Ador. 
Mhyco Aquino as Lorenz Gabriel: A former classmate of Ador in the PNPA who quit and later became part of the Tuazon family's human trafficking syndicate. He later branched out and became a member of a riding-in-tandem group. He was later killed by Cardo in a gunfight. 
Lander Vera Perez as Alfred Borromeo: Teddy's Editor-in-Chief at the tabloid Ladlad. He was later murdered by Don Emilio's henchmen. 
Kiray Celis as Mitch: Lorraine's best friend who had a crush on JP. She spread rumors that Lorraine was using drugs to get revenge on her due to her and JP's relationship. She later reconciles with Lorraine after their short fall out. 
Long Mejia as Francisco "Paco" Alvarado: Cardo's friend and Paquito's father who lives with Lola Flora and her family. He later became a jeepney driver.
PJ Endrinal as Wally Nieves: Cardo's landlord and Amor's brother. He is now an adopted member of Cardo's family after Amor's departure and he took over the rentals. In the series finale, he and the family with Onyok reunited with Cardo after finishing Renato and Lucio with Oscar and Task Force Agila. They reveal to him of Lola Flora's passing, in which Cardo broke down. After visiting Lola Flora's grave, he and his family with Onyok moved to Botolan to be close and to take care of Cardo.
Jeffrey Tam as Otep: A friend and neighbor of Cardo and his family, formerly one of Kapitana Gina's henchmen. He left for personal reasons.
Roy "Shernan" Gaite as Gido: A jeepney driver from the barangay adjacent to Cardo's who became one of Kapitan Gina's bumbling sidekicks.
Pedro "Zaito" Canon, Jr. as Nick: One of Kapitana Gina's bumbling sidekicks.
Arlene Tolibas as Marikit Flores: The hairdresser and nail stylist hired by Lola Flora to continue Amor's salon after her departure; later becomes an adopted member of Cardo's family.
Gary Lim as Gaspar Romero: General Olegario's bodyguard and driver. He was later killed.

Introducing (Child Stars)

McNeal "Awra" Briguela as Macario "Makmak" Samonte, Jr.: Yolly and Elmo's adopted son who is openly gay. He was killed by President Cabrera's private army after trying to protect Lola Flora, who they intended to kill by invading their house. Cardo avenged his death by finishing off President Cabrera.
James "Paquito" Sagarino as Paquito Alvarado: Paco's son and Onyok's best friend. In the series finale, he returned with Onyok and the kids, and upon reuniting with Cardo, they informed him of Lola Flora's death. After visiting Lola Flora, he moved with Cardo and his family to Botolan to be close with him.
Rhian "Dang" Ramos as Amanda "Dang" Ignacio: A child whose parents were killed and was adopted by Cardo and his family. In the series finale, she and the kids with Onyok reunite with Cardo, and they inform him of Lola Flora's death. After visiting Lola Flora, she later moved to Botolan with the family to be close with Cardo.
Shantel Crislyn Layh "Ligaya" Ngujo as Ligaya Dungalo: A child whose parents were killed and was adopted by Cardo and his family. In the series finale, she and the kids with Onyok reunite with Cardo and inform him of Lola Flora's death. After visiting Lola Flora, she joined with Cardo and her family in Botolan to be close with him.
Iyannah Sumalpong as Kristelle "Letlet" Sandoval: A child whose mother and caretaker were killed, and is soon adopted into Cardo's family in which Cardo and Alyana see her as a daughter. She, along with the family and Onyok later reunited with her adopted father in the series finale, in which they revealed to him of Lola Flora's death. After visiting Lola Flora's grave, she along with her family moved to Botolan to be close with Cardo.
Enzo Pelojero as Dexter Flores: A friend of Makmak, Paco, Dang, and Ligaya during their stay at one of their old houses before moving.
Heart Ramos as Mary Grace "Gracie" Hidalgo: The half-sister of Mara, Yohan and Aubrey's younger sister and Marissa and Oscar's daughter who is totally oblivious of the events happening around her. She was later shot by Vice President Cabrera's men and dies as a result in the hospital just minutes later. Her death was finally avenged when Cardo finished Lucas to death.

Recurring

Simon Ezekiel Pineda as Honorio "Onyok" Amaba: Cardo's ward and Junior and Pacquito's best friend who looks up to Cardo and desires to be a noble and honest cop like his father-figure. He later goes to live with his mother, Rowena, after Cardo leaves for his mission. In the series finale, he reunites with Cardo and the rest of his old family with the kids after the death of Lola Flora, and Cardo's final mission in finishing Renato and Lucio. After visiting Lola Flora's grave, he later stayed with Cardo and his family in Botolan to be close with him.
Lei Andrei Navarro as Dominador "Junior" G. de Leon, Jr.: Carmen and Ador's son, who is also Lola Flora's great-grandson, Cardo's nephew and Onyok's jolly best friend. He then goes to live with his uncle, Ryan, and grandparents in the province to avoid further chaos. 
Dennis Padilla as Edgar Guzman: Nora's husband; Ryan, Billy, and Carmen's father and Junior's grandfather. After Carmen's death, he returns to the province to live a peaceful life. He appears as a guest in Cardo and Alyana's wedding. 
Ana Roces as Leonora "Nora" Montano-Guzman: Edgar's wife who is also Ryan, Billy, and Carmen's mother and also is Junior's grandmother. She later returns to the province but returns to attend Cardo's wedding with Alyana. 
Brace Arquiza as Ryan M. Guzman: Carmen and Billy's younger brother who wants to be a cop like his idols: Cardo, Ador, and Billy. 
Joel Torre as Teodoro "Teddy" Arevalo: JP and Alyana's father who witnessed Don Emilio killing Pablo, Cardo's father. He has a disliking for Marco due to his temper, and supports Cardo and Alyana getting back together. He later started writing against Cabrera's abusive actions. However, in Season 8, when his daughter Alyana died, he became very angry at Cardo for failing to protect his daughter, until Ramil reveals that Lito is the reason why Alyana died. Teddy and his wife then apologized to Cardo for their anger. He was killed by Renato because of not leaving his wife, Virgie until her last breath and not risking of his safety. He was avenged by Cardo and Oscar, when they embarked on their final mission to finish Renato and Lucio with Task Force Agila.
Shamaine Centenera-Buencamino as Virginia "Virgie" R. Arevalo: Alyana and JP's mother and Teddy's wife. She has resentment towards Cardo for leaving Alyana and wants her to marry Marco despite it being against Teddy's wishes. She later tried to be a devil's advocate by trying to discourage her husband and son from writing criticizing remarks against Cabrera. In Season 8, when her daughter Alyana died, her resentment towards Cardo grew again and began to side with Lito until Ramil revealed Lito's true colors and the reason behind Alyana's death. Virgie and her husband then apologized to Cardo for their anger. She was killed by Jacob after Renato and his forces was able to track them down before Cardo shoots him. She and her husband were fully avenged when Cardo, Oscar and Task Force Agila finished off Renato.
McCoy de Leon as Juan Pablo "JP" R. Arevalo: Alyana's younger brother and Teddy and Virgie's son who has a crush on Lorraine. He appears and visits his family from time to time as he is currently living in Tokyo, Japan. He later settled permanently after his sister went to Cardo. He also helps his father research Cabrera's abuses. 
Elisse Joson as Lorraine Pedrosa: Jerome's younger cousin and Belen's niece who has a crush of JP. 
Daisy Reyes as Belen Girona: Jerome's mother and Lorraine's aunt.
Benj Manalo as Felipe "Pinggoy" Tanyag, Jr.: Alyana's friend who was a former cameraman turned reporter. 
Jay Gonzaga as James Cordero: Diana's secretary. He helped Vendetta in secret by giving them intel or gadgets. James would then become a member of Vendetta and later Task Force Agila. By the series end, he was killed after being held hostage by Renato & Lucio with their groups. He and  Task Force Agila are avenged when Oscar & Cardo finished off Renato & Lucio.

Minor and Guests

• Mama mallows as Cong.Subito's kabit igat n burikat.
• Ana magbanua as Yolly's sister in tuhod
• Vice Ganda as Emmanuel Moreno known as Ella
• Ivana Alawi as Don Emelio's baby grill
• Belle Mariano as Rachel Tuazon anak ng nagkain ng mikmik sa sasakyan

Notes

See also
 List of Ang Probinsyano guest stars
 List of Ang Probinsyano episodes

References

External links

Lists of Philippine television series characters
Lists of drama television characters
Lists of soap opera characters by series
Lists of action television characters